3-Mercaptopropionic acid (3-MPA) is an organosulfur compound with the formula HSCH2CH2CO2H.  It is a bifunctional molecule, containing both carboxylic acid and thiol groups.  It is a colorless oil.  It is derived from the addition of hydrogen sulfide to acrylic acid.

Reactions and uses
It is competitive inhibitor of glutamate decarboxylase, and therefore acts as a convulsant. It has higher potency and faster onset of action compared to allylglycine.

It is used to prepare hydrophilic gold nanoparticles, exploiting the affinity of gold for sulfur ligands.

See also
Allylglycine
 Thiolactic acid (2-mercaptopropionic acid)

References

Convulsants
Glutamate decarboxylase inhibitors
Thiols
Propionic acids